Acacia eremophila is a shrub of the genus Acacia and the subgenus Plurinerves that is native to Western Australia.

Description
The straight and erect phyllodes are patent to erect.

It blooms from July to October producing simple inflorescences with globular heads with a diameter of  containing 10 to 25 yellow flowers.
 
The dark brown seeds with an elliptic to oblong-ovate shape.

Taxonomy
The species was first formally described by the botanist William Vincent Fitzgerald in 1912 is the work New West Australian Plants published in the Journal of Botany, British and Foreign.

There are two varieties:
Acacia eremophila var. eremophila
Acacia eremophila var. variabilis

A. eremophila closely resembles Acacia densiflora.

Distribution
It is native to an area in the Wheatbelt and the Goldfields-Esperance regions of Western Australia.

See also
 List of Acacia species

References

eremophila
Acacias of Western Australia
Plants described in 1912
Taxa named by William Vincent Fitzgerald